

History
The National Lottery Regulatory Commission is the body that regulates lottery activities in Nigeria. The commission was established through the National Lottery Act of 2005. Lanre Gbajabiamila is the Director General of the Commission.

References
NLRC Website

See also
List of Nigerian agencies

Government of Nigeria
Economy of Nigeria
Lotteries